Jesse Schuurman (born 11 March 1998) is a Dutch professional footballer who plays as a midfielder for Eerste Divisie club Roda JC, on loan from De Graafschap.

Club career

Vitesse
Schuurman joined Vitesse in 2007 from boyhood club SC Bemmel and went on to become a prominent figure in their reserve side, first appearing in 2015. On 29 March 2018, following several matchday squad appearances, Schuurman agreed to a new deal with Vitesse, running until June 2019. On 14 April 2018, Schuurman made his Vitesse debut during their 7–0 thrashing of Sparta Rotterdam, replacing Mason Mount in the 88th minute.

De Graafschap
On 21 June 2019, Schuurman signed a two-year contract with recently relegated Eerste Divisie club De Graafschap.

Roda JC (loan)
On 30 January 2023, Schuurman was loaned by Roda JC Kerkrade.

Career statistics

References

External links
 

1998 births
People from Lingewaard
Footballers from Gelderland
Living people
Association football midfielders
Dutch footballers
Netherlands youth international footballers
Eredivisie players
Eerste Divisie players
SBV Vitesse players
De Graafschap players
Roda JC Kerkrade players